Kotopeky is a municipality and village in Beroun District in the Central Bohemian Region of the Czech Republic. It has about 300 inhabitants.

Administrative parts
The village of Tihava is an administrative part of Kotopeky.

Notable people
Johann Hermann Bauer (1861–1891), Austrian chess master

References

External links

Villages in the Beroun District